Albert Raney Sr. is the patriarch of the Raney family. He and his family lived and presumably still live along Arkansas' National Scenic 7 Byway between Harrison and Jasper, and have had a major impact on the history of that area. 

In the early twentieth century Raney purchased a piece of land in an area previously known as "Wilcockson". They diverted water from a nearby creek, called Mill Creek, to create a waterfall and a pond. They renamed the area Marble Falls, the name it has today. They then turned the pond into a trout farm.

In 1949, Raney purchased "Wild Horse Cavern", a cave that had been a tourist attraction since 1928, but had been closed and virtually abandoned for ten years. He revitalized it by cleaning out debris left by vandals, and adding safety features such as stairs, hand rails, and an electric lighting system. In 1950, he reopened the cave as Mystic Caverns, and began giving tours. 

Albert Raney Sr. turned the cave property over to his son, Albert Raney Jr. in 1959. Albert Jr. and friends and family would continue giving guided tours of the cave until it was sold to the developers of Dogpatch USA in 1966 along with the family trout farm. However, the Raney's would continue to manage the trout farm and Mystic Caverns for Dogpatch. 

In 1981, Mystic Caverns was sold to an unknown party, but was still managed by Bruce Raney, son of Albert Jr. In 1993 Dogpatch USA was closed, and the trout farm died with it. Mystic Caverns, however, is still in operation however but is now owned by Steve Rush and is in no way affiliated with the Raney family.

References

Year of birth missing (living people)
Living people
Families from Arkansas
People from Newton County, Arkansas